Janis Ian, also titled Janis Ian II to avoid confusion with her debut album of the same name, is the tenth studio album by American singer-songwriter Janis Ian, originally released in 1978.

Before the release of Janis Ian, the singer had been spending most of her time touring Japan, where her previous studio albums Aftertones and Miracle Row had been much more successful than in the United States, where her early 1978 live album Remember... would never be issued. Janis Ian was recorded in late 1977 but not released until her return to the United States in the late summer of 1978, by which time she had been engaged and married to Portuguese novelist Tino Sargo.

When Janis Ian was released, the singer was pleased, and the record at first appeared to be doing well. However, the early commercial promise of Janis Ian faded rapidly, and the album would continue a commercial decline in all territories, reaching only number 120 in the United States and number 97 in Australia.

Track listing

Personnel
 Joseph Wissert – producer
 Ed Sprigg – engineer
 John "BJ John" Smith – assistant engineer
 Ted Spencer – assistant engineer
 Mike Reese – mastering
 Ron Frangipane – conductor

Musicians
 Janis Ian – lead vocals, guitar, keyboards, backing vocals
 Wayne Andre – trombone
 Claire Bay – backing vocals
 Richard Davis – upright bass
 Sal DiTroia – guitar
 Steve Gadd – drums
 Al Gorgoni – guitar
 Artie Kaplan – baritone saxophone
 Jik Malin – percussion
 Jeff Mironov – guitar
 Tony Studd – bass trombone

Charts

Notes

References

Janis Ian albums
1978 albums
albums produced by Joe Wissert
Columbia Records albums